Carmo de Souza (July 19, 1940 – December 22, 2008), commonly known as "Rosa Branca" ("White Rose"), was a Brazilian basketball player with the Brazil national basketball team. De Souza competed with Brazil at the 1959, 1963 and 1970 FIBA World Championships and won two bronze medals at the 1960 and 1964 Summer Olympics. He was born in Araraquara.

References

External links
 
 
 
 

1940 births
2008 deaths
People from Araraquara
Brazilian men's basketball players
1959 FIBA World Championship players
1963 FIBA World Championship players
1970 FIBA World Championship players
Olympic basketball players of Brazil
Olympic bronze medalists for Brazil
Basketball players at the 1960 Summer Olympics
Basketball players at the 1964 Summer Olympics
Basketball players at the 1968 Summer Olympics
Olympic medalists in basketball
Basketball players at the 1959 Pan American Games
Basketball players at the 1963 Pan American Games
Pan American Games bronze medalists for Brazil
Pan American Games silver medalists for Brazil
Pan American Games medalists in basketball
Sport Club Corinthians Paulista basketball players
FIBA World Championship-winning players
Sociedade Esportiva Palmeiras basketball players
Medalists at the 1960 Summer Olympics
Medalists at the 1964 Summer Olympics
Medalists at the 1959 Pan American Games
Medalists at the 1963 Pan American Games
Sportspeople from São Paulo (state)